Annie Salager (born Paris) is a French poet.

She has published fifteen books of poetry and many books in limited editions. Her first book won the 1963 Prix René Blieck. She won the 1999 Louise Labe Award, and the 2011 Prix Mallarmé.

She lives in Lyon.

Works
La Nuit introuvable, Henneuse, 1963. Prix René Blieck
Présent de sable, Chambelland, 1964
Histoire pour le jour, Seghers, 1968
La Femme buisson, SGDP, 1973, lithography Max Schöendorff. Prix J. Cocteau 
Les Fous de Bassan, SGDP, 1976, lithography Max Schöendorff, 
Récit des terres à la mer, Federop, 1978, lithography Max Schöendorff
Figures du temps sur une eau courante, Belfond, 1983, 
Chants, Comp'Act, 1988; 1994
Le Poème de mes fils. éd. En forêt, bilingual French German, 1997
Terra Nostra, Le Cherche Midi, 1999. Prix Louise Labé
Les dieux manquent de tout, Aspect. 2004, 
Rumeur du monde, L'act Mem, 2007, 
Aimez-vous la mer le tango, Ed. En Forêt, 2009, 
Travaux de lumière, La rumeur libre, 2010,  - Prix Mallarmé 2011

Chapbooks
Dix profils sur la toile, l’été, Illustrations Pierre Jacquemon. Henneuse
Les lieux du jour. Pulsations. Mémoire déchirée. Vite au lit., 4 manuscripts, Ed. À travers. Linocuts  Jacques Clauzel
Double figure de louange, Le Verbe et L'Empreinte, 1990, etchings Paul Hickin
Calendrier solaire, Le Verbe et l'Empreinte, 1997, etchings Marc Pessin
Des lieux où souffle l’espace Le Verbe et l’Empreinte, 2001, etchings Marc Pessin
Poursuites, traces, Manière noire, 1996, etchings Paul Hickin
Dits de manière noire, Manière noire, 1997, ouvrage collectif, etchings Michel Roncerel
La Chasse à la gazelle, Manière noire, 1999, etchings Michel Roncerel
Palmyre, Manière noire 2003, etchings Michel Roncerel
Ombres portées, Tipaza, 2003, ouvrage collectif, photos J.Clauzel
Glissements vers l’une, 2004, drawings Maxime Préaud
Galta, coll. Le vent refuse, 2005, paintings Jacqueline Merville
L'Embarcadère de bout du monde, Manière noire, 2006, etchings Michel Roncerel

Stories
Marie de Montpellier Presses du Languedoc, 1991 
Le Pré des langues éditions du Laquet, 2001, interview 
Un week-end chez l’autre, collected works, La passe du vent 2003
Passants, collected works, Aedelsa 2004
La muette et la prune d'ente, Urdla, Villeurbanne, 2008
Bleu de terre, La passe du vent, 2008

References

External links

Official website
"Palmyre", UniVerse

French poets
French women poets
Living people
Year of birth missing (living people)